The  are a volcanic mountain range on the border between Nagano Prefecture and Yamanashi Prefecture on the island of Honshū in Japan.

Description
The mountain range consists of two volcanic groups, Northern Yatsugatake Volcanic Group and Southern Yatsugatake Volcanic Group. The two volcanic groups of Yatsugatake, North and South, have different characteristics. The North Yatsugatake mountains are gradual and lower while the South Yatsugatake mountains are steep and are more alpine in nature.

The southern group ranges from the Natsuzawa Pass to the end of the mountain range. The northern range includes Mount Yoko to the other end of the range. Mount Tateshina is also included.

These mountains form a major part of the Yatsugatake-Chūshin Kōgen Quasi-National Park.

Geology
These mountains consist of older eroded complex volcanoes, which were made by repeated volcanic eruptions over many thousands years. The last eruption was estimated from 600 to 800 years ago at Mount Yoko of North Yatsugatake Mountains. This is the only remaining active volcano. The other volcanoes are extinct.

The volcanoes consist mostly of pyroxene andesite. Yatsugatake also lies nearby to the Fossa Magna (ja).

Local legend
According to legend, Yatsugatake was once higher than Mount Fuji, but Konohanasakuya-hime, the goddess of Mount Fuji, tore it down out of jealousy, leaving the collection of peaks that exists today. Paul Hunt muses that this might not be far from the truth considering that Yatsugatake is older than Fuji and as Fuji rose in prominence Yatsugatake wore away.

Ecology
Deciduous forests reach up 800-1700m above sea level. Above this zone is the subalpine zone reaching up to 2500m. Siberian dwarf pine inhabits this subalpine zone. On one part of Mount Nishi under 1700m grows a rare form of spruce, Picea koyamae. Rock Ptarmigan (Lagopus muta) are also native to these mountains, but are under threat due to loss of the Siberian dwarf pine habitat and also due to expansion of the range of the red fox. Humans have enabled the expansion of the red fox by leaving trash behind in the mountains. Also growing in the subalpine zone are Abies veitchii and Abies mariesii.

Gallery

References

External links 

 Kita Yatsugatake (Northern Yatsugatake) - Geological Survey of Japan
 Minami Yatsugatake (Southern Yatsugatake) - Geological Survey of Japan
 

 
Volcanoes of Nagano Prefecture
Volcanoes of Yamanashi Prefecture
Volcanoes of Honshū
Mountain ranges of Nagano Prefecture
Mountain ranges of Yamanashi Prefecture
Pleistocene stratovolcanoes
Stratovolcanoes of Japan